Dinner for Two may refer to:

 Dinner for Two (1947 film), Swedish comedy film
 Dinner for Two (1996 film), Canadian animated short film
 "Last Kiss", a 2003 song by Deerhoof from Apple O'